Vagnur Mohr Mortensen (born 10 February 1983) is a Faroese retired footballer who played for HB Tórshavn. He played at HB for his whole career and was capped by the Faroe Islands 4 times.
He played as a defender.

Club career
Mortensen made his senior debut in 1999 and won 4 league titles with HB until his retirement in 2012. In 2006, he scored an 89th-minute goal on the final day of the season which helped win HB the league title with minutes to spare.

In August 2012, during a win over rivals B36 Tórshavn, he suffered a broken fibula and announced his retirement from football shortly afterwards. His shinbone was damaged so badly that he wouldn't be able to play football at a high level again.
In total, he made 156 appearances for HB in the top division also scoring 12 goals.

International career
Mortensen has been capped with the Faroe Islands four times.

References

External links 
 

Faroese footballers
Faroe Islands international footballers
Havnar Bóltfelag players
1983 births
Living people
People from Tórshavn
Association football defenders
Faroe Islands youth international footballers